"Paro" is a song by French singer Nej', released on May 21, 2021 from her album SOS : Chapitre II. Paro was sung in French as the artist herself speaks French. 

The song later went viral on several social media platforms such as TikTok and YouTube starting in 2022.

Charts

Certifications

Zeynep Bastık version

On July 28, 2022, Turkish singer Zeynep Bastık released a Turkish version of the song.

Charts

References

2021 songs
2021 singles
French-language songs
Chamber pop songs